Natálie Taschlerová (born 9 December 2001) is a Czech ice dancer. With her brother and skating partner, Filip Taschler, she is the 2020 Nebelhorn Trophy champion and two-time Czech national champion (2022–2023). They represented the Czech Republic at the 2022 Winter Olympics. 

On the junior level, she is the 2019 JGP USA bronze medalist and has competed in the final segment at three World Junior Championships, their highest placement being fourteenth in 2019. Nationally, she is a three-time Czech national junior champion.

Career

Early career 
Taschlerová began learning to skate in 2004 and subsequently began learning ice dance alongside her brother Filip following the end of his partnership with Karolína Karlíková. Years later, Taschler would say that "our relationship is better since we started skating together. When we were younger, we fought like small kids, but now we are adults. We respect each other."

Taschlerová/Taschler made their international junior debut in the 2017–18 season, including two appearances on the ISU Junior Grand Prix, placing twelfth in Poland and thirteenth in Austria.  After winning what would be the first of three Czech junior national titles, they made their first appearance at the World Junior Championships, where they finished eighteenth.

Competing their second season on the Junior Grand Prix, Taschlerová/Taschler were thirteenth at JGP Lithuania and eleventh at their home JGP Czech Republic. They then won their first international junior medals competing at minor events, a bronze at the Open d'Andorra and a silver at the junior category at the Inge Solar Memorial.  Junior national champions for the second time, they finished the season placing fourteenth at the 2019 World Junior Championships.

2019–2020 season: JGP medal & senior debut 
In the off-season, Taschlerová/Taschler began training part-time in the United States with Collin Brubaker and Oleg Epstein, in addition to longtime coach Matteo Zanni in Milan. They returned to the Junior Grand Prix, competing first at 2019 JGP United States in Lake Placid, New York.  In a significant improvement over their previous two years, they came fourth in the rhythm dance. Then they overtook Canadians Makita/Gunara in the free dance for the bronze medal. They finished in fifth place at their second JGP in Croatia.

Following the Junior Grand Prix, Taschlerová/Taschler elected to make their international senior debut, winning the silver medal at the Open d'Andorra and thereby obtaining the technical minimum qualifications to attend their first European Figure Skating Championships, where they finished in nineteenth position. They participated in a third senior event, coming eighth at the Egna Trophy.

Winning the Czech junior title for the third time, they were again their country's entry to the World Junior Championships. Taschlerová fell out of her twizzle at the beginning of the rhythm dance, landing them in nineteenth place in that segment. They rose to sixteenth position following the free dance. Taschlerová/Taschler had been assigned to make their senior World Championship debut at the 2020 World Championships in Montreal, but these were cancelled due to the onset of the coronavirus pandemic.

2020–2021 season: Worlds debut 
Due to the pandemic, the siblings could not continue training in the United States under Epstein and Brubaker and entered the season with only Zanni as their coach. They began their first full senior season at the 2020 CS Nebelhorn Trophy, their first Challenger event, which due to the pandemic was attended only by European teams largely training in the area. Taschlerová/Taschler won the gold medal. They attended their second Egna Trophy, also winning gold there.

To conclude the season, Taschlerová/Taschler competed at the 2021 World Championships in Stockholm, where they placed twenty-second in the rhythm dance and did not advance to the free dance. As a result, they did not qualify a berth for the Czech Republic at the coming Winter Olympics on the first of two opportunities to do so.

2021–2022 season: Beijing Olympics 
Taschlerová/Taschler began the new season on the Challenger series, placing fifth with new personal bests at the 2021 CS Lombardia Trophy. In continued pursuit of an Olympic spot, they were next assigned as the Czech entry to the 2021 CS Nebelhorn Trophy, the second and final opportunity for dancers to qualify to the Olympic Games.  They were second in the rhythm dance with another new personal best but dropped to fifth after the free dance due to a twizzle error, but their placement was sufficient to clinch the fourth of four available berths at the 2022 Winter Olympics. Afterward, their federation formally named them to the Czech Olympic team.

After winning the Pavel Roman Memorial and placing sixth at the 2021 CS Warsaw Cup, Taschlerová/Taschler won the Czech national title (finishing second overall at the 2022 Four National Championships). They were assigned to the 2022 European Championships in Tallinn and finished eleventh, qualifying for the free dance for the first time.

Taschlerová/Taschler began the 2022 Winter Olympics as the Czech entries in the rhythm dance segment of the Olympic team event. They placed sixth in the segment, securing five points for the Czech team. This was the highest Czech placement on day one of the event. Ultimately, the Czech team did not advance to the second stage of the competition and finished eighth overall. In the dance event, Taschlerová/Taschler placed seventeenth and qualified for the free dance. They moved up one place in the free dance, finishing sixteenth.

The team concluded the season at the 2022 World Championships, held in Montpellier with Russian dance teams absent due to the International Skating Union banning all Russian athletes due to their country's invasion of Ukraine. Taschlerová/Taschler finished thirteenth.

2022–2023 season: Grand Prix debut 
For the new season, Taschlerová and Taschler opted to perform a free dance based on the theme of climate change, a concept they had discussed since their junior career. Competing at two Challengers to begin, they won the bronze medal at the 2022 CS Lombardia Trophy before finishing fourth at the 2022 CS Finlandia Trophy. They were invited to make their senior Grand Prix debut, and came fifth at the 2022 MK John Wilson Trophy. They also finished fifth at their second assignment, the 2022 Grand Prix of Espoo, 5.40 points back of bronze medalists Turkkila/Versluis of Finland.

After winning the Czech national title and finishing first overall at the 2023 Four National Championships, Taschlerová/Taschler competed at the 2023 European Championships in Espoo. They finished fifth in the rhythm dance, qualifying to the final flight in the free dance by a margin of 0.42 over the French team Lopareva/Brissaud. They dropped behind the French in the free dance, finishing sixth overall. This was the highest placement for a Czech dance team at Europeans since Mrázová/Šimeček in 1995. Taschlerová/Taschler's result qualified a second berth for the Czech Republic at the following year's European championships, which was anticipated to be important given the rise of another Czech sibling team, Kateřina Mrázková and Daniel Mrázek, in the junior ranks that season. The siblings said afterward that "we definitely wanted to go for a medal. But overall, this experience of skating in the strongest group will strengthen us in the future." They hoped to finish in the top ten at the 2023 World Championships to earn a second berth there as well.

Programs

With Taschler

Competitive highlights 
GP: Grand Prix; CS: Challenger Series; JGP: Junior Grand Prix

With Taschler

Detailed results 
Small medals for short and free programs awarded only at ISU Championships.

With Taschler

Senior results

Junior results

References

External links 
 
 
 
 

2001 births
Living people
Czech female ice dancers
Figure skaters from Brno
Figure skaters at the 2022 Winter Olympics
Olympic figure skaters of the Czech Republic